Agnes Helén Pettersson (in the Riksdag Helén Pettersson in Umeå) (born 4 April 1972 in Umeå Parish) is a Swedish Social Democratic politician. She has been a member of the Riksdag since 2006. She currently takes up seat number 109 for the constituency of Västerbotten County. She was first assigned the Environment and Agriculture Committee, a committee in which she served in until 2014. After 2014 she was assigned the Labour Market Committee. She has also been an alternate for the Swedish delegation to the Nordic Council.

Since 2012 has Pettersson been the spokesperson for Arbetarnas bildningsförbund (ABF).

References

External links
Helén Pettersson at the Riksdag website

Members of the Riksdag from the Social Democrats
Living people
1972 births
Women members of the Riksdag
21st-century Swedish women politicians
Members of the Riksdag 2006–2010
Members of the Riksdag 2010–2014
Members of the Riksdag 2014–2018
Members of the Riksdag 2018–2022
Members of the Riksdag 2022–2026